Joseph Lynch may refer to:
 Joseph Lynch (athlete) (1878–1952), British athlete
 Joseph Lynch (cricketer) (1880–1915), Irish cricketer
 Joseph Lynch (Irish politician) (died 1954), Irish Sinn Féin politician, member of the 2nd Dáil (1921–22)
 Joseph Lynch (figure skater) (born 1985), American pair skater
 Joseph Lynch (trade unionist), British trade unionist
 Joseph Henry Lynch (1911–1989), British artist
 Joseph Patrick Lynch (1872–1954), American prelate of the Roman Catholic Church
 Joseph B. Lynch (1840–1900), religious leader who founded the Christ's Sanctified Holy Church movement

See also
 Joe Lynch (disambiguation)